This is a list of fighter aces in World War II from Slovakia. For other countries see List of World War II aces by country.

List

References

World War II flying aces
Slovakian
Flying aces